The , known as the G-Con in Europe, is a family of gun peripherals designed by Namco for the PlayStation consoles. The original controllers used traditional light gun technology, while newer controllers use LED tracking technology.

Background
The first GunCon NPC-103 (G-Con 45 in Europe) was bundled with the PlayStation conversion of Time Crisis. To make the gun affordable to consumers, the force feedback feature of the Time Crisis arcade gun was omitted, and an additional fire button was included in lieu of releasing a pedal controller for the game's ducking mechanic. A second version of the GunCon, known as the GunCon 2 NPC-106 (G-Con 2 in Europe), was bundled with the PlayStation 2 conversion of Time Crisis II and Time Crisis 3. Time Crisis 4 came out for the PlayStation 3 bundled with the GunCon 3 NC-109 (G-Con 3 in Europe). In Japan, all three GunCon models were also available for sale as a separate accessory outside of a game bundle.

Prior to the GunCon, the Konami Justifier (sold as the Hyper Blaster in Europe and Japan) was the first light gun peripheral for the PlayStation and a few games support it. With the exception of Die Hard Trilogy 2: Viva Las Vegas, Elemental Gearbolt, Maximum Force, and Mighty Hits Special, games that support the Justifier are not compatible with the GunCon and vice versa. This was because Namco designed the GunCon so that it would only work with Namco games. Electronic Gaming Monthlys Crispin Boyer said that a Namco public relations representative was shocked when he informed him that he'd tried the GunCon with Maximum Force (not a Namco game) and confirmed that it worked.

Models

GunCon

The GunCon controller (known as G-Con 45 in Europe) uses the cathode ray timing method to determine where the barrel is aimed at on the screen when the trigger is pulled. It features a button below the barrel on either side of the gun (buttons A and B, both performing the same function) for auxiliary in-game control, such as to take cover and reload in Time Crisis. The controller is released in black in Japan, and gray (and eventually, in orange) in both Europe and North America. The controller is compatible with some PlayStation 2 GunCon titles, but is not compatible with PlayStation 3 due to its lack of controller ports. Many games that support it allow the A and B buttons to be swapped, making it comfortable for both right and left-handed players.

GunCon 2

GunCon 2 (G-Con 2 in Europe) features a smaller body, as well as a more rounded shape when compared with the original GunCon. The side buttons, A and B, have been moved rearward to a position directly above the trigger. Two new smaller buttons, SELECT and START, have been added to the left side of the shaft. Prominent additions to this second GunCon model is a D-pad at the back of the gun barrel and a C button added at the bottom of the gun handle. These new buttons served to open new gameplay opportunities, such as character movement in Dino Stalker or the ability to use two guns at once in Time Crisis II. The gun uses a USB connection as opposed to a PlayStation controller port of the GunCon 1 and also hooks into the video signal of the console (either composite video or the Y signal of component video). The controller is released in black in Japan, blue in Europe, and orange in North America. It is not compatible with original PlayStation titles or PlayStation 3 titles. The GunCon 2, with compatible games, can work on older models of the PlayStation 3 featuring any form of hardware-based PlayStation 2 backwards compatibility.

GunCon 3

The GunCon 3 utilizes two infrared LEDs as markers, placed on the left and right sides of the screen. An image sensor in the muzzle tracks the markers as reference points for determining where the gun is pointing on the screen. As opposed to the GunCon and GunCon 2, which are only compatible with CRT-based displays, the GunCon 3 supports a wide variety of display types, including LCD and Plasma.

The GunCon 3 features a "sub-grip", mounted underneath the barrel and extending to the left side for use with the left hand. On the sub-grip is an analog stick and two shoulder buttons, like in a modern gamepad. At the back end of the gun barrel is another analog stick and two buttons, B1 and B2, underneath. Another two buttons, C1 and C2, are placed along the left side of the barrel. The analog sticks allow the player to play first-person shooting games with manual aiming/firing of the light gun.

In regards to appearance, all Japanese GunCon 3 controllers feature a black coloring, though due to US toy gun laws, the US/PAL release of the GunCon 3 controllers are molded of bright orange plastic. This controller has been criticized for being uncomfortable for left-handed gamers.

Games supporting the GunCon

GunCon compatible games

PS games
 Elemental Gearbolt
 Extreme Ghostbusters
 Die Hard Trilogy 2: Viva Las Vegas
 Ghoul Panic
 Gun Bare! Game Tengoku 2
 Gunfighter: The Legend of Jesse James
 Judge Dredd
 Maximum Force
 Mighty Hits Special
 Moorhuhn series
 Point Blank
 Rescue Shot
 Resident Evil Survivor (Japan and PAL only)
 Time Crisis
 Time Crisis: Project Titan

PS2 games
 Cocoto Funfair (EU)
 Gunfighter II: Revenge of Jesse James
 Endgame
 Death Crimson OX
 Time Crisis II
 Vampire Night
 Resident Evil: Dead Aim

GunCon 2 compatible games
Some GunCon 2 (PS2) games are compatible with the original GunCon, unless the game utilizes the extra buttons on the GunCon 2.
 Crisis Zone
 GunCom 2 [EU] (AKA Death Crimson OX [JP])
 Dino Stalker [US] (AKA Gun Survivor 3: Dino Crisis [JP])
 Endgame (US/EU)
 Gunfighter II: Revenge of Jesse James (EU)
 Gunvari Collection + Time Crisis (JP)
 Ninja Assault [JP/EU/NA]
 Resident Evil: Dead Aim [US] (AKA Gun Survivor 4 Biohazard Heroes Never Die [JP])
 Resident Evil Survivor 2 Code: Veronica [EU/JP]
 Starsky & Hutch (coop mode only)
 Time Crisis II Time Crisis 3 Vampire Night [EU/JP/US]
 Virtua Cop: Elite EditionGunCon 3 compatible games
 Time Crisis 4 Time Crisis: Razing Storm [US/EU] (AKA Big 3 Gun Shooting [JP])
 Deadstorm Pirates iGunCon iGunCon for iOS was released on July 21, 2011, which allows players to use an iPhone or iPod Touch in a similar fashion to the GunCon on Time Crisis 2nd Strike, an iOS exclusive entry in the Time Crisis series. iGunCon, along with Time Crisis 2nd Strike, was pulled from the app store in March of 2015.

ReceptionElectronic Gaming Monthlys four-person "review crew" gave the original GunCon scores of 7.5, 7.0, 8.0, and 7.5 out of 10. They criticized Namco's decisions to make it compatible only with Namco games and make Namco games incompatible with other light guns, but praised the GunCon's extreme precision and accuracy, in particular when firing near the edge of the screen (a common trouble spot for light guns). Lead reviewer Crispin Boyer was also pleased with the low price of the GunCon/Time Crisis'' bundle.

See also

 Jogcon
 NeGcon
 List of light gun games

Notes

References

Light guns
PlayStation (console) accessories
PlayStation 2 accessories
PlayStation 3 accessories
Namco